Rober Haddeciyan (also spelled and pronounced as Haddedjian) (born January 26, 1926, in Istanbul, Turkey), also known as Rober Haddeler, is an Armenian writer, playwright, and since 1967 editor-in-chief of Marmara, an Armenian-language daily newspaper.

Marmara (also known as Nor Marmara) is published six times a week (daily except Sundays). Circulation is reported at 2,200 per issue.

Biography
Rober Haddeciyan was born in 1926 in the district of Bakırköy in Istanbul, Turkey, to Avedis Haddeciyan and Siranush.  He graduated from the Pangaltı Armenian Mkhitarist High School in 1944 and is an Istanbul University Faculty of Letters Department of Philosophy graduate. Haddeciyan, who was already working for Marmara as a journalist, became the editor-in-chief of the newspaper in 1967. His columns in Nor Marmara are translated into Turkish by his daughter-in-law Karolin Haddeler and published in the weekly Turkish supplement. He has published 50 to 60 books so far. One of his most famous books is his novel Arasdagh (Ceiling), which has also been published in Turkish under the title Tavan.

Awards
In 2011, on the occasion of the 20th anniversary of the Republic of Armenia's Independence, President Serzh Sargsyan awarded Haddeciyan the Mesrob Mashdots Medal for his contributions to Armenian literature, theater, and journalism.

References

External links
Marmara official website
 (In Armenian).

1926 births
Armenian-language writers
Turkish journalists
Turkish Christians
Turkish people of Armenian descent
Living people
Writers from Istanbul
Turkish male writers